British forces in Afghanistan may refer to:

 British army interventions, within the larger scope of Afghanistan–United Kingdom relations during the 19th and 20th centuries
 British combat forces of Operation Veritas (2001 – 2002), and Operation Herrick (2002 – 2014)
 British training forces of Operation Toral (2015 – 2021)
 Operation Pitting, in August 2021.